List of Christmas hit singles may refer to:

List of Christmas hit singles in the United Kingdom
List of popular Christmas singles in the United States